Pier Michele Bozzetti (born 22 June 1945), known by his stage name Miko Mission, is an Italian singer.

Career 
The career of Miko Mission began at a young age, performing as a singer in a comedy represented by Alessandria, Gelindo at age seven. At age fourteen, Miko formed his first band 'I passi per la Musica', later renamed 'Oscars'. The group participated in several singing competitions including Flip for San Remo held in Venice – Lido. Miko won the competition and went on to sign a contract with Ariston Records in 1964.
Adopting the stage name Don Miko, he debuted with "45 Gente... che ragazza!" and later "Non hai più niente per me", which became a summer hit. In 1965 he entered the Sanremo Music Festival with the song "E poi verrà l'Autunno", in couple with Timi Yuro, failing to access the final.

In the 1970s, he recorded some songs with the name Pier Bozzetti, achieving good critical reviews. In 1975 he came back to Sanremo Festival, credited as Miko, with the song "Signora Mia". Bozzetti reached the peak of his popularity during the 1980s under the stage name Miko Mission with Italo disco hits like "How Old Are You?". Master Blaster produced a remix of the song in 2003 on their album We Love Italo Disco. In the same year "The World Is You" was remixed by Italo Allstars.

Discography 

 "How Old Are You?" (1984)
 "The World Is You" [#35 Germany] (1984)
 "Two For Love" [#14 Sweden] (1985)
 "Strip Tease" (1986)
 "Toc Toc Toc" (1987)
 "I Like A Woman's Heart" (1987)
 "I Believe" (1988)
 "One Step To Heaven" (1989)
 "Rock Me Round The World" (1989)
 "I Can Fly" (1993)
 "Mr. Blue" (1996)
 "Let It Be Love" (2010)
 "Universal Feeling" (2014)
 "Do You Wanna Dance" (2020)

Sources

External links 

 

1945 births
Italian dance musicians
Italian male singers
Italian Italo disco musicians
Living people